Smither is a surname. People so named include:
 Bob Smither (born 1944), Libertarian Party Texas congressional candidate
 Chris Smither (born 1944), American folk-blues singer, guitarist, and songwriter
 Denise Orme, stage name of Jessie Smither (1885–1960), English music hall singer, actress and musician
 Elizabeth Smither (born 1941), New Zealand poet and writer
 Henry Smither (1873–?), US Army officer and football coach
 James Smither FRIBA (1833–1910), Irish architect and Ceylonese public servant
 Michael Smither (born 1939), New Zealand painter and composer, husband of Elizabeth Smither

Fictional characters
 Dale Smither, from the television series Heroes

See also
 Smithers (name)